Beth Richards is a New Hampshire politician.

Career
On November 8, 2016, Richards was elected to the New Hampshire House of Representatives where she represents the Merrimack 13 district. She assumed office later in 2016. She is a Democrat.

Personal life
Richards resides in Concord, New Hampshire. Richards has two children.

References

Living people
Politicians from Concord, New Hampshire
Women state legislators in New Hampshire
Democratic Party members of the New Hampshire House of Representatives
21st-century American politicians
21st-century American women politicians
Year of birth missing (living people)